Coyote Dam may refer to:

 Coyote Creek Dam (Lake County, California) which impounds Hidden Valley Lake
 Coyote Dam (Santa Clara County, California) which impounds Coyote Lake
 Coyote Dam (Colorado)
 Coyote Flat Dam (Lassen County, California) which impounds Coyote Reservoir 
 Coyote Hold Dam (Arizona)
 Coyote Valley Dam (Mendocino County, California) which impounds Lake Mendocino